Fly-Up is the debut Japanese single by South Korean girl group Kep1er. It was released on September 7, 2022, by Wake One Entertainment and Ariola Japan. The single consists of four tracks, including the lead track "Wing Wing".

Background and release
On July 20, 2022, Wake One Entertainment announced Kep1er would be releasing their debut Japanese single titled Fly-Up on September 7, marking their debut in Japan. On July 31, the lead track "Wing Wing" was announced to be released additionally on August 3. The music video teaser for "Wing Wing" was released on the same day.

Commercial performance
Fly-Up debuted at number 2 on the Oricon Singles Chart in the chart issue dated September 5–11, 2022, with 68,316 copies sold. The single went on to sell over 100,000 copies.

Promotion
On the same day of the announcement of the single release, it was also announced that Kep1er will be holding a live showcase to celebrate their debut in Japan. The showcase was held on September 10 and 11 following the release of the single. Kep1er also performed the lead track "Wing Wing" at CDTV Live! Live! and Venue101 on September 3 and 5 respectively.

Track listing

Charts

Weekly charts

Monthly charts

Year-end charts

Certifications

Release history

References 

2022 singles
2022 songs
Ariola Japan singles
Kep1er songs
Japanese-language songs
Wake One Entertainment single albums